Wardner is a side-scrolling platform game developed by Toaplan and published in arcades worldwide by Taito in 1987.

In Wardner, players assume the role of a child named Dover on a journey to rescue his kidnapped girlfriend Mia from the titular warlock. Initially released for the arcades, the title was later ported to other platforms by different third-party developers including the Famicom Disk System and Sega Genesis, with each one featuring several changes and additions compared to the original version. Conversions for both the Nintendo Entertainment System and PC Engine were also in development but never released.

Wardner was met with positive reception from video game magazines since its release in arcades, though reviewers drew comparison with Capcom's Ghosts 'n Goblins due to its gameplay style, while the Genesis version was met with mixed reviews after launch. As of 2019, the rights to the title is owned by Tatsujin, a company founded in 2017 by former Toaplan member Masahiro Yuge and now-affiliate of Japanese arcade manufacturer exA-Arcadia alongside many other Toaplan IPs.

Gameplay 

Wardner is a side-scrolling action-platform game similar to Ghosts 'n Goblins and Rastan where the players takes control of Dover, the main protagonist through five stages (six in the Genesis version) of varying themes set in a fantasy land, with the main objective being rescuing his girlfriend Mia from the titular antagonist by defeating his servants, some of which that act as a boss at the end of the stage in order to progress further on the journey.

Some of the levels featured are linear in nature, populated with obstacles and enemies, requiring the player to traverse the stage by running, jumping, climbing, shooting or dodging enemies, while other levels that are featured later in the game become more maze-like and exploratory, making the player take different routes to reach the end. Along the way, gold orbs can be picked up by defeating enemies to increase the player character's firepower, as well as money that is used in shops at the end of each stage to acquire protective items and new attacks, though some of them can also be obtained during the level.

The game hosts a number of hidden bonus secrets to be found on certain setpieces within the scenery, which is also crucial for reaching high-scores to obtain extra lives. The title uses a checkpoint system in which a downed single player will respawn at the beginning of the checkpoint they managed to reach before dying. Getting hit by enemy fire, colliding against solid stage obstacles, falling off the stage or running out of time will result in losing a live and once all lives are lost, the game is over unless the players insert more credits into the arcade machine to continue playing.

Development and release 
Wardner was released on arcades worldwide by Taito in 1987, while the North American version was distributed under the name Pyros. Osamu Ōta served as composer for the title's soundtrack under the alias "Ree" in one of his first roles on the video game industry prior to Twin Hawk and Snow Bros.. Former Toaplan composer Masahiro Yuge stated in a 2012 interview with Japanese publications Shooting Gameside that Ōta joined the company when their staff was small, while Tatsuya Uemura stated in a 2009 interview that the project was created by Etsuhiro Wada and was also influenced by Wizardry. On 25 June 1989, an album containing music from the title and other Toaplan games was published exclusively in Japan by Datam Polystar.

On 25 March 1988, a port of Wardner developed by Daiei Seisakusho was released exclusively in Japan for the Famicom Disk System by Taito. A version for the Nintendo Entertainment System was developed and planned to be published by Sammy in North America under the name Pyross. Despite being showcased to the public during the Summer Consumer Electronics Show 1990, this version of the game was never officially released for unknown reasons.

On 26 April 1991, a reworked port of the game was developed for the Sega Genesis by Dragnet and first released in Japan by Visco Corporation under the name Wardner no Mori Special, while a North American release by Mentrix Software occurred later on May of the same year. In 1988, a version for the PC Engine was announced to be in development by NEC Avenue under the helm of  Prototype founder Toshio Tabeta and despite being previewed, the project was then moved on to the PC Engine CD-ROM² and ultimately to the PC Engine Super CD-ROM² before being cancelled after multiple delays, despite work on the port being completed.

In 2019, Japanese company M2 announced that in 2020 they will release every game by Toaplan (excluding Mahjong Sisters and Enma Daiō) for consoles in Japan including Wardner. In 2022, both the arcade and the Famicom Disk System versions will be included in the Hishou Same! Same! Same! compilation for Nintendo Switch and PlayStation 4 as part of M2's Toaplan Arcade Garage label as downloadable content.

Reception and legacy 

In Japan, Game Machine listed Wardner on their November 1, 1987 issue as being the ninth most-successful table arcade unit of the month, outperforming titles such as Arkanoid: Revenge of Doh and Black Tiger. Wardner was met with positive reception from critics since its release in the arcades and compared the game with Ghosts 'n Goblins by Capcom. Mike Pattenden of Commodore User praised the presentation, visuals and challenge. Clare Edgeley of Computer and Video Games gave positive remarks to the gameplay and level design. Likewise, both Robin Hogg and Cameron Pound from The Games Machine commended the visuals, action and gameplay. Although Crash'''s Steve Jarratt and Julian Rignall noted its lack of originality, they praised the gameplay. Den of Geek, however, regarded it to be a solid but forgettable title from Toaplan.Wardner was received with a more mixed reception on Sega Genesis from reviewers. In their respective retrospective review, gaming website HonestGamers felt mixed about the Genesis port.

In more recent years, the rights to the game and many other IPs from Toaplan are now owned by Tatsujin, a company named after Truxton'''s Japanese title that was founded in 2017 by Yuge, who are now affiliated with arcade manufacturer exA-Arcadia.

Notes

References

External links 
 Wardner at GameFAQs
 Wardner at Giant Bomb
 Wardner at Killer List of Videogames
 Wardner at MobyGames
 Wardner at The Toaplan Museum

1987 video games
Arcade video games
Cancelled Nintendo Entertainment System games
Cancelled TurboGrafx-16 games
Famicom Disk System games
Fantasy video games
Multiplayer and single-player video games
Sega Genesis games
Side-scrolling platform games
Taito games
Taito arcade games
Toaplan games
Video games developed in Japan
Video games scored by Osamu Ōta
Video games set in forests
Visco Corporation games